The 1999–2000 National Professional Soccer League season was the sixteenth season for the league.

League standings

American Conference

East Division

Central Division

National Conference

North Division

Midwest Division

Playoffs

Scoring leaders

GP = Games Played, G = Goals, A = Assists, Pts = Points

League awards
 Most Valuable Player: Hector Marinaro, Cleveland
 Defender of the Year: James Dunn, Wichita
 Rookie of the Year: Clovis Simas, Kansas City
 Goalkeeper of the Year: Victor Nogueira, Milwaukee
 Coach of the Year: Keith Tozer, Milwaukee
 Finals MVP: Michael Richardson, Milwaukee

All-NPSL Teams

All-NPSL Rookie Teams

References
Major Indoor Soccer League II (RSSSF)

1999 in American soccer leagues
2000 in American soccer leagues
1999 in Canadian soccer
2000 in Canadian soccer
1999-2000